Benjamin Hermansen (29 May 1985 – 26 January 2001) was a Norwegian boy whose father was born in Ghana; his mother was Norwegian. He was stabbed to death at Holmlia in Oslo, Norway, just before midnight on 26 January 2001 by people from the neo-Nazi group Boot Boys. Joe Erling Jahr (born 1981) and Ole Nicolai Kvisler (born 1979) were convicted of the murder and sentenced to 16 and 15 years in prison respectively. A third defendant, Veronica Andreassen, was convicted on a lesser charge of abetting bodily harm causing death and sentenced to three years in prison.

Response to the murder
Since the murder was motivated by xenophobia and racism, it mobilised large parts of the Norwegian population. Throughout the entire country, marches were organised to protest against the murder, with nearly 40,000 people participating in Oslo.

"Song to Benjamin"
Hermansen was buried on 6 February 2001. "Song to Benjamin", written by several of his friends for the service, was presented at his funeral. The song was later recorded in studio by artists including Noora Noor and Briskeby.

The Benjamin Prize
In 2003, the Benjamin Prize was founded in Hermansen's memory. It is awarded on 27 January every year.

Michael Jackson's Invincible 
American singer Michael Jackson dedicated his 2001 album Invincible to Benjamin Hermansen (and also to his own parents and grandmother). The reason for this has partly to do with the fact that the Holmlia boy Omer Bhatti and Jackson were close friends, and Bhatti was at the same time a good friend of Benjamin Hermansen. On the album cover, next to the image of a rose, it reads:

Testament
Clara Dorothea Weltzin (1925–2007), an Oslo woman with far-right views, left 250,000 Norwegian kroner (c. US$43,000) to Ole Nicolai Kvisler in her will, something that caused major headlines in Norwegian media, and there were also suspicions regarding the legality of doing it.

References

1985 births
2001 deaths
2000s in Oslo
Anti-black racism in Europe
Deaths by person in Norway
Deaths by stabbing in Norway
Hate crimes
Murdered Norwegian children
2001 murders in Norway
Neo-Nazism in Norway
Norwegian murder victims
Norwegian people of Ghanaian descent
People murdered in Norway
Place of birth missing
Racially motivated violence against black people
Racially motivated violence in Norway
Trials in Norway
January 2001 events in Europe
2001 in Norway
Incidents of violence against boys
Male murder victims